The James Henry and Rachel Kilby House was built around 1898 and was listed on the National Register of Historic Places in 2005.

The house is a two-story I-house with a rear, gabled ell one-and-a-half-stories tall.  It had a hall-parlor plan. It rests upon locust and chestnut wood piers in the front, and upon a pine sill atop support stones in the rear.

In 2005, the house was still covered with its original unpainted yellow poplar shiplap siding.

A second contributing building on the property is the barn built at the same time as the house, built of hand-hewn pine, oak, and locust logs, upon a continuous stone foundation. Gables at each end have yellow poplar siding;  it has a standing seam metal roof.  It is of a type commonly called a transverse crib barn in Georgia, and has cribs on each side of a wide runway.

References

I-houses in Georgia (U.S. state)
Barns on the National Register of Historic Places in Georgia (U.S. state)
National Register of Historic Places in Rabun County, Georgia
Houses completed in 1898